Jan Žambůrek (born 13 February 2001) is a Czech professional footballer who plays as a central midfielder for Viborg FF. 

Žambůrek is a product of the Slavia Prague academy and made his professional breakthrough with Brentford in 2019. After falling out of favour, he transferred to Viborg FF in January 2022. Žambůrek has been capped by the Czech Republic at youth level.

Club career

Slavia Prague 
A central midfielder, Žambůrek began his career in the academies at Bohemians 1905 and Slavia Prague and progressed to U19 level with the latter club. He was a part of the U17 team which won the 2017–18 league and cup double and left the club in August 2018.

Brentford 
On 9 August 2018, Žambůrek moved to England to sign a three-year contract with the B team at Championship club Brentford on a free transfer, with the option of a further year. Žambůrek received his maiden call into the first team squad for a league match versus Hull City on 23 February 2019 and with the match safe at 5–1, he made the first senior appearance of his career as a late substitute for Saïd Benrahma. The appearance made him the first player born in the 21st century to play a competitive match for the club. He played out the season with the B team and was a part of the 2018–19 Middlesex Senior Cup-winning squad.

Žambůrek spent the 2019–20 pre-season with the first team group and after making two early-regular season appearances, he signed a new four-year contract and was promoted into the first team squad. By late October 2019, he had broken into the team as a regular substitute. In January 2020, Žambůrek's performances at club and international level during 2019 were recognised with a runner-up finish in voting for the FACR's Young Player of the Year award. He finished the season with 19 appearances, but did not feature in Brentford's unsuccessful playoff campaign.

After making just two EFL Cup appearances during the first month of the 2020–21 season, Žambůrek joined League One club Shrewsbury Town on loan until the end of the 2020–21 season. He made 9 appearances before the loan was terminated on 11 January 2021. Žambůrek made seven further appearances during the second half of the season. Due to injury, Žambůrek was not involved during Brentford's playoff campaign, which culminated in promotion to the Premier League after victory in the 2021 Championship play-off Final. He made his return to match play as a half-time substitute during the B team's final 2021–22 pre-season friendly and remained with the team during the first half of the regular season. Žambůrek transferred away from Brentford on 12 January 2022, after making 29 first team appearances during  years with the club.

Viborg FF 
On 12 January 2022, Žambůrek signed a -year contract with Danish Superliga club Viborg FF for an undisclosed fee. The move reunited him with his former Brentford B head coach Lars Friis. He ended the 2021–22 season with 14 appearances and was a member of the squad which qualified for the 2022–23 Europa Conference League second qualifying round via a playoff.

International career 
Žambůrek has been capped by the Czech Republic at U15, U16, U17, U18, U19 and U21 level. He won his maiden U20 call-up for a friendly versus Slovakia on 5 September 2020, but was released from the squad prior to the match. Žambůrek was named as standby for the U21 team's 2021 European U21 Championship qualifier versus Greece on 13 November 2020, but he was not named in the matchday squad. In March 2021, he was named as a standby for the Czechs' 2021 UEFA European U21 Championship tournament finals squad. Žambůrek won his first full U21 call up for a pair of 2023 European U21 Championship qualifiers versus Kosovo in October 2021 and started in both matches.

Personal life 
After joining Brentford, Žambůrek enrolled at West Thames College.

Career statistics

Honours 
Brentford B
 Middlesex Senior Cup: 2018–19

Czech Republic U18
 SportChain Cup: 2019

References

External links 
 
 Jan Žambůrek at fotbal.cz
Jan Žambůrek at vff.dk
 

Living people
Czech footballers
Czech expatriate footballers
2001 births
Association football midfielders
Czech Republic under-21 international footballers
Czech Republic youth international footballers
Brentford F.C. players
SK Slavia Prague players
Shrewsbury Town F.C. players
Viborg FF players
English Football League players
Expatriate footballers in England
Expatriate men's footballers in Denmark
Czech expatriate sportspeople in England
Czech expatriate sportspeople in Denmark
Footballers from Prague
Danish Superliga players